Jhapandanga railway station is a Kolkata Suburban Railway station on the Howrah–Bardhaman chord line operated by Eastern Railway zone of Indian Railways. It is situated at Panch Shimul, Jhapandanga in Purba Bardhaman district in the Indian state of West Bengal. This railway station serves in Abujhati Gram Panchayet and Jhapandanga village area.

History
The Howrah–Bardhaman chord, the 95 kilometers railway line was constructed in 1917. It was connected with  through Dankuni after construction of Vivekananda Setu in 1932. Howrah to Bardhaman chord line including Jhapandanga railway station was electrified in 1964–66.

References

Railway stations in Purba Bardhaman district
Howrah railway division
Kolkata Suburban Railway stations